The Smoky Hill River is a  river in the central Great Plains of North America, running through Colorado and Kansas.

Names
The Smoky Hill gets its name from the Smoky Hills region of north-central Kansas through which it flows. American Indians living along the Smoky Hill considered it and the Kansas River to be the same river, and their names for it included Chetolah and Okesee-sebo.  Early maps of European explorers called the river (also in combination with the Kansas River) the River of the Padoucas as its source is located in what was then Padouca (Comanche) territory.

The USGS lists a number of other variant names for the Smoky Hill River, including Chitolah River, Fork of the Hill Buckaneuse, La Fourche de la Cote Boucaniere, La Touche de la Cote Bucanieus, Manoiyohe, Pe P'a, Sand River, Shallow River, Smoky Creek, Branche de la Montagne a la Fumee, Ka-i-urs-kuta, Oke-see-sebo River, and Rahota katit hibaru, among others.

Geography
The Smoky Hill River originates in the High Plains of eastern Colorado and flows east. Both the main course of the river and the North Fork Smoky Hill River rise in northern Cheyenne County, Colorado. From there, the river continues generally eastward through the Smoky Hills region. The Saline River joins the river in eastern Saline County. The Solomon River, joins the Smoky Hill in western Dickinson County. The Smoky Hill joins the Republican River at Junction City, Kansas to form the Kansas River.

The combined Smoky Hill-Saline Basin drains . Via the Kansas and Missouri Rivers, the Smoky Hill is part of the Mississippi River watershed.

The Smoky Hill feeds two reservoirs: Cedar Bluff Reservoir in Trego County and Kanopolis Lake in Ellsworth County.

The largest city along the Smoky Hill River is Salina. Besides Junction City, other Kansas towns along the river include Ellsworth, Marquette, Lindsborg, and Abilene.

History

The earliest known reference to the river was on a 1732 map by French cartographer Jean Baptiste Bourguignon d'Anville who labeled it the "River of the Padoucas". A 1758 map referred to it as the "Padoucas River". An early reference to the river as the Smoky Hill was by American explorer Zebulon Pike during his 1806 expedition to visit the Pawnee. The Kansas–Nebraska Act of 1854 established Kansas Territory, which included the entire length of the Smoky Hill River.

With the onset of the Pike's Peak Gold Rush in 1858, an ancient American Indian trail along the river known as the Smoky Hill Trail provided the shortest, fastest route west across Kansas. Beginning in 1865, the trail served as the route for the short-lived Butterfield Overland Despatch. To protect travelers, the U.S. Army established several forts along the trail, including Fort Downer, Fort Harker, Fort Hays, Fort Monument, and Fort Wallace. Before American colonization, the land along the Smoky Hill River was favored hunting ground for the Plains Indians. In 1867, the Comanche and the Kiowa, and in 1868, the Sioux and the Arapaho signed treaties withdrawing their opposition to the construction of a railroad along the Smoky Hill River. The Kansas Pacific Railway was completed in 1870, rendering the Smoky Hill Trail obsolete.

In 1948, the U.S. Army Corps of Engineers finished construction of a dam on the Smoky Hill for flood control in southeastern Ellsworth County creating Kanopolis Lake. In 1951, the United States Bureau of Reclamation completed another dam on the river, this one for irrigation as well as flood control, in southeastern Trego County, Kansas creating Cedar Bluff Reservoir.

See also
List of rivers of Colorado
List of rivers of Kansas
Smoky Hills

References

Rivers of Colorado
Rivers of Kansas
Tributaries of the Kansas River
Rivers of Cheyenne County, Colorado
Rivers of Logan County, Kansas
Rivers of Saline County, Kansas
Rivers of Dickinson County, Kansas
Rivers of Geary County, Kansas
Rivers of Ellsworth County, Kansas
Rivers of McPherson County, Kansas
Rivers of Ellis County, Kansas